Timemaster is a role-playing game centered on traveling through time and alternate dimensions, written by Mark D. Acres, Andria Hayday and Carl Smith (game designer) and published by Pacesetter Ltd in 1984. Players take on the role of Time Corps agents to fix deviations in the timeline of the game. The primary antagonists are the Demoreans, a fictional race of shape-shifting aliens from another dimension who are determined to mold time to suit their needs.

History
The games company Pacesetter Ltd was founded by former employees of TSR who had left the company because they felt that in terms of role-playing games, it was headed in the wrong direction. Although Pacesetter was short-lived, it produced several role-playing games within a one-year period, all based around the same house system of rules, with the first three being Chill, Star Ace, and Timemaster. 

Timemaster, published by Pacesetter in 1984, was designed by Mark Acres, Garry Spiegle, Andria Hayday, Carl Smith, and Gali Sanchez, with cover art by Jim Holloway. Timemaster was published as a boxed set containing 
 two books (64 pages and 32 pages)
 a 16-page pamphlet
 a large colour map
 counters
 dice 

After Pacesetter folded, their assets were acquired by 54°40' Orphyte, who published two Timemaster adventures, Miss Him, Miss Him, Miss Him (1991) and Darkest Before the Dawn (1992), and also supported the line with RPGA tournaments. In 2011, Goblinoid Games purchased all rights to Timemaster from 54°40' Orphyte.

According to game historian Shannon Appelcline, Timemaster "did more to play up the issues of time travel than any of the other scant few games in the genre, past or future".

Contents
Timemaster is a role-playing game (RPG) featuring a time-travel system in which the player characters are agents of the Time Corps, who are dedicated to preventing their enemies from changing history. The rules are basic and easy to learn. Movement and combat is position-oriented, designed for use with counters on a hex grid. The 64-page "Traveler's Manual" covers characters, combat (individual characters and mass battles), skills, paranormal talents, equipment, and non-player characters. The 32-page "Guide to the Continuum" describes the Time Corps and the enemy Demoreans, with brief overviews of ancient Athens, Rome during the time of Julius Caesar, medieval England, Tudor England, Napoleonic France, and World War II France. The 16-page "Red Ace High" pamphlet is an introductory scenario set during World War I. The game is compatible with Chill and Star Ace.

Setting
Timemaster is a science fiction role-playing game. Characters may come from any point in history and from alternate dimensions. The Time Corps is based far in the future, in 7192. Adventures may take place anywhere from medieval times to the space age.

Time Corps
In Timemaster, the Time Corps are the policing agency responsible for safeguarding the natural flow of time both within the Corps' home dimension and in other dimensions. Agents are rescued from the past and recruited into the ranks, though they are forbidden from returning to any time that coincides with their previous lives.

Editions
The game was originally produced by a company called Pacesetter Ltd. Once Pacesetter Ltd ceased operations in 1986 (though it continues to exist as a Goblinoid Games product line), Timemaster was bought in 1990 by 54° 40' Orphyte, Inc. In 2011, the game was purchased by Goblinoid Games, and a revised version of the ruleset was published. Goblinoid Games plans to reprint all of the scenarios and sourcebooks. A total of 12 official modules and one major rules supplement were released by Timemasters publishers between 1984 and 1992. The revised edition of the rules has the same cover as the original game, but the original public domain interior art has been replaced with custom illustrations.

Products
Numerous products were published for Timemaster.

Pacesetter edition
 Timemaster (box set)

Game tools
 Timemaster Screen (included Missing: PT 109 scenario)

Sourcebooks and scenarios

 The Assassin Queen (scenario)
 Clash of Kings (scenario)
 The Cleopatra Gambit (scenario)
 Crossed Swords (scenario)
 Partisans from the Shadows (scenario)
 Sea Dogs of England (scenario)
 Temples of Blood (scenario)
 Terrible Swift Ford (scenario)
 Timestorm (scenario)
 Timetricks (sourcebook)
 Whom the Gods Destroy (scenario)

54° 40' Orphyte, Inc. products

Scenarios
 Darkest Before the Dawn (scenario)
 Miss Him, Miss Him, Miss Him (scenario)

Pacesetter System game line (Goblinoid Games)
 Timemaster Core Rulebook

Reception
Steve Norledge reviewed Timemaster for White Dwarf #61, giving it an overall rating of 7 out of 10, and stated that "Overall, I quite liked Timemaster — it is an unpretentious little game, simple and yet provides the best yet framework for time travel rolegaming. It is eminently suited to the 'one-off' style of play, and, yet, with effort, would also be a good campaign game (though it would have a very episodic feel to it)."

Jim Bambra reviewed Timemaster for Imagine magazine, and stated that "With its infinite variety of settings Timemaster has a lot of potential. Players can experience many different situations and save the world numerous times over."

Warren Spector reviewed Timemaster in Space Gamer No. 75. Spector commented that "Time travel RPGs seem to be in a mini-renaissance these days. If you're into this sort of game (and I confess, I'm not), Timemaster may be a good choice. It's got a fairly interesting unifying theme; the game does an excellent job of making time travel seem plausible, and the "Guide to the Continuum" is a gem. In this most open-ended form of roleplaying, providing players direction is no simple task. Timemaster does a fine job."

Other reviews
Different Worlds #39 (May/June, 1985)
Asimov's Science Fiction v8 n13 (1984 12 Mid))

References

External links
 Official Pacesetter home page

Pacesetter games
Role-playing games introduced in 1984
Time travel and multiple reality role-playing games
Timemaster
Parallel universes in fiction